Canada was the host nation for the 1976 Summer Olympics in Montreal, held from 17 July to 1 August 1976. 385 competitors, 261 men and 124 women, took part in 173 events in 23 sports.

For the first and, so far, only time in Summer Olympics history, the host nation failed to obtain a gold medal.

Medalists
Canada finished in 27th position in the final medal rankings, with five silver medals and six bronze medals.

Archery

Canada was represented by two women and two men in Montreal. It was the second time Canadians had competed in archery. Lucille Lemay became the most successful Canadian Olympic archer by taking 5th place, surpassing Donald Jackson's 6th-place finish four years earlier. Canada placed sixth in the national standings for archery.

Women's individual competition:
Lucille Lemay – 2401 points (→ 5th place)
Wanda Allen – 2303 points (→ 16th place)

Men's individual competition:
Dave Mann – 2431 points (→ 7th place)
Edward Gamble – 2362 points (→ 16th place)

Athletics

Men's 5.000 metres
 Grant McLaren
 Heat – 13:46.40 (→ did not advance)

Men's 10.000 metres
Dan Shaughnessy
Chris McCubbins

Men's 4 × 100 metres relay
Hugh Spooner, Marvin Nash, Albin Dukowski, and Hugh Fraser
 Heat – 39.72s
 Semi-final – 39.46s
 Final – 39.47s (→ 8th place)

Men's 4 × 400 metres relay
 Ian Seale, Don Domansky, Leighton Hope, and Brian Saunders
 Heat – 3:03.89
 Final – 3:02.64 (→ 4th place)

Men's marathon
 Jerome Drayton – 2:13:30 (→ 6th place)
 Tom Howard – 2:22:08 (→ 30th place)
 Wayne Yetman – 2:24:17 (→ 36th place)

Men's high jump
 Greg Joy
 Qualification – 2.16m
 Final – 2.23m (→  Silver medal)
 Claude Ferragne
 Qualification – 2.16m
 Final – 2.14m (→ 12th place)
 Robert Forget
 Qualification – 2.05m (→ did not advance)

Men's long jump
 Richard Rock
 Qualification – 7.57m (→ did not advance)
 Jim Buchanan
 Qualification – 7.49m (→ did not advance)
 Jim McAndrew
 Qualification – 7.48m (→ did not advance)

Men's discus throw
 Ain Roost
 Qualification – 56.56m (→ did not advance)
 Borys Chambul
 Qualification – 55.86m (→ did not advance)
 Bishop Dolegiewicz
 Qualification – NM (→ did not advance)

Men's 20 km Race Walk
 Marcel Jobin – 1:34:33 (→ 23rd place)
 Pat Farrelly – 1:41:36 (→ 33rd place)
 Alex Oakley – 1:44:08 (→ 35th place)

Women's shot put
Lucette Moreau
Final – 15.48 m (→ 13th place)

Basketball

Men's team competition
Preliminary round (group A):
 Defeated Japan (104-76)
 Defeated Cuba (84-79)
 Lost to Soviet Union (85-108)
 Defeated Australia (81-69)
 Defeated Mexico (92-84)
Semi-finals:
 Lost to United States (77-96)
Bronze Medal Match:
 Lost to Soviet Union (72-100) → 4th place
Team roster
Alexander Devlin
Martin Riley
Bill Robinson
John Cassidy
Derek Sankey
Robert Sharpe
Cameron Hall
James Russell
Robert Town
Romel Raffin
Lars Hansen
Phil Tollestrup
Head coach: John Donohue

Women's team competition
Team roster
Joyce Douthwright
Joanne Sargent
Anne Hurley
Christine Critelli
Beverley Bland
Coleen Dufresne
Sheila Strike
Sylvia Sweeney
Carol Turney
Donna Hobin
Angela Johnson
Beverly Barnes
Head coach: Brian Heaney

Boxing

Men's Light Flyweight (– 48 kg)
 Sidney McKnight
 First round – lost to Li Byong-Uk (PRK), KO-1

Men's flyweight (– 51 kg)
 Ian Clyde
 First round – bye
 Second round – defeated Alick Chiteule (ZAM), walkover
 Third round – defeated Charlie Magri (GBR), KO-3
 Quarterfinals – lost to Ramón Duvalón (CUB), 0:5

Men's bantamweight (– 54 kg)
 Chris Ius
 First round – bye
 Second round – defeated Mohamed Ayele (ETH), walkover
 Third Round – lost to Weerachart Saturngrun (THA), 0:5

Men's featherweight (– 57 kg)
 Camille Huard
 First round – bye
 Second round – defeated Bachir Koual (ALG), walkover
 Third Round – lost to Leszek Kosedowski (POL), 0:5

Men's Light Welterweight (– 64 kg)
 Chris Clarke
 First round – bye
 Second round – defeated Lasse Friman (FIN), 5:0
 Third Round – lost to József Nagy (HUN), RSC-3

Men's welterweight (– 67 kg)
 Carmen Rinke
 First round – bye
 Second round – defeated Kenneth Bristol (GUY), walkover
 Third round – defeated Yoshioki Seki (JPN), 4:1
 Quarterfinals – lost to Jochen Bachfeld (GDR), 0:5

Men's Light Middleweight (– 71 kg)
 Michael Prevost
 First round – lost to Vasile Didea (ROM), DSQ-3

Men's middleweight (– 75 kg)
 Bryan Gibson
 First round – lost to Bernd Wittenburg (GDR), KO-3

Men's Light Heavyweight (– 81 kg)
 Roger Fortin
 First round – lost to Anatoliy Klimanov (URS), 0:5

Canoeing

Cycling

Eleven cyclists represented Canada in 1976.

Individual road race
 Pierre Harvey – 4:49:01 (→ 24th place)
 Gilles Durand – 5:03:13 (→ 54th place)
 Tom Morris – did not finish (→ no ranking)
 Brian Chewter – did not finish (→ no ranking)

Team time trial
 Brian Chewter
 Marc Blouin
 Serge Proulx
 Tom Morris

Sprint
 Jocelyn Lovell – 1:08.852 (→ 13th place)

1000m time trial
 Gordon Singleton – 17th place

Team pursuit
 Ron Hayman
 Jocelyn Lovell
 Adrian Prosser
 Hugh Walton

Diving

Equestrian

Fencing

13 fencers, 9 men and 4 women, represented Canada in 1976.

Men's foil
 Michel Dessureault
 Lehel Fekete

Men's épée
 Alain Dansereau
 George Varaljay
 Geza Tatrallyay

Men's team épée
 Alain Dansereau, Michel Dessureault, Geza Tatrallyay, George Varaljay

Men's sabre
 Marc Lavoie
 Eli Sukunda
 Peter Urban

Men's team sabre
 Marc Lavoie, Peter Urban, Imre Nagy, Eli Sukunda

Women's foil
 Chantal Payer
 Donna Hennyey
 Susan Stewart

Women's team foil
 Fleurette Campeau, Susan Stewart, Donna Hennyey, Chantal Payer

Football

Gymnastics

Handball

Men's team competition
 Wolfgang Blankenau
 Christian Chagnon
 François Dauphin
 Hugues de Roussan
 Pierre Désormeaux
 Pierre Ferdais
 Robert Johnson
 Richard Lambert
 Claude Lefebvre
 Danny Power
 Stan Thorseth
 Luc Tousignant
 Claude Viens
 Pierre St. Martin

Head Coach: Slobodan Misic

Women's team competition
Team roster
 Lucie Balthazar
 Louise Beaumont
 Manon Charette
 Danielle Chenard
 Nicole Genier
 Mariette Houle
 Louise Hurtubise
 Denise Lemaire
 Francine Parizeau
 Monique Prud'homme
 Joanes Rail
 Nicole Robert
 Hélène Tétreault
 Johanne Valois

Hockey

Men's team competition
The Men's National Team from Canada competed for the second time at the Summer Olympics. The squad finished tenth in the McGill University's Molson Stadium in Montreal.

Preliminary round (group A)
 Lost to Australia (0-3)
 Defeated Argentina (3-1)
 Lost to India (0-3)
 Lost to Malaysia (0-1)
 Lost to the Netherlands (1-3)
Classification matches
 9th/12th place: bye
 9th/10th place: lost to Belgium (2-3) → Tenth place
Team roster
 ( 1.) James MacDougall
 ( 2.) Sarbjit Dusang
 ( 3.) David Bissett
 ( 4.) Alan Hobkirk
 ( 5.) Reg Plummer
 ( 6.) Lee Wright
 ( 7.) Lance Carey
 ( 8.) Peter Motzek
 ( 9.) Doug Pready
 (10.) Kelvin Wood
 (11.) Peter Lown
 (12.) Fred Hoos
 (13.) Paul "Bubli" Chohan
 (14.) Mike Mouat
 (15.) Kuldip Gosal
 (16.) Antonie Schouten
Head coach: Errol Hartley

Judo

Men's lightweight (– 73 kg)
 Brad Farrow

Men's Half-Middleweight (– 81 kg)
 Wayne Erdman

Men's middleweight (– 90 kg)
 Rainer Fischer

Men's half-heavyweight (– 100 kg)
 Joseph Meli

Men's Open Class
 Tom Greenway

Modern pentathlon

Three male pentathletes represented Canada in 1976.

Individual
 John Hawes
 George Skene
 Jack Alexander

Team
 John Hawes
 George Skene
 Jack Alexander

Rowing

Sailing

Shooting

Swimming

Volleyball

Men's team competition
Preliminary round (group A)
 Lost to Czechoslovakia (0-3)
 Lost to Poland (0-3)
 Lost to South Korea (0-3)
 Lost to Cuba (0-3)
Classification matches
 No match after Egypt withdrew → Ninth place
Team roster
Edward Alexiuk
Pierre Belanger
Thomas Graham
Kerry Klostermann
Donald Michalski
John Paulsen
Garth Pischke
Lawrence Plenert
Bruno Prasil
Elias Romanchych
Gregory Russell
Alan Taylor
Head coach: William Neville

Women's team competition
Preliminary round (group A)
 Lost to Peru (2-3)
 Lost to Hungary (1-3)
 Lost to Japan (0-3)
Classification matches
 5th/8th place: lost to Cuba (2-3)
 7th/8th place: lost to Peru (1-3) → 8th place
Team roster
Regyna Armonas
Betty Baxter
Carole Bishop
Barbara Dalton
Mary Dempster
Kathy Girvan
Debbie Heeps
Anne Ireland
Connie Lebrun
Claire Lloyd
Patty Olson
Audrey Vandervelden
Head coach: Moo Park

Water polo

Men's team competition
Team roster
Clifford Barry
David Hart
Dominique Dion
Gabor Csepregi
Gaétan Turcotte
Paul Pottier
George Gross
Guy Leclerc
Jim Ducharme
John MacLeod
Patrick Pugliese
Paul Mallet

Weightlifting

Wrestling

References

Nations at the 1976 Summer Olympics
1976 Summer Olympics
Summer Olympics